The Columbus Presbyterian Church was a historic church on Arkansas Highway 73 in Columbus, Arkansas.

The church was built in 1875 and added to the National Register of Historic Places in 1982.  It was destroyed by a falling tree in 2008, and removed from the National Register in 2013.

See also
National Register of Historic Places listings in Hempstead County, Arkansas

References

Presbyterian churches in Arkansas
Churches on the National Register of Historic Places in Arkansas
Greek Revival church buildings in Arkansas
Churches completed in 1875
Churches in Hempstead County, Arkansas
National Register of Historic Places in Hempstead County, Arkansas
Former National Register of Historic Places in Arkansas